Blaenwaun is a small village in Carmarthenshire, Wales,  north of Whitland. It is one of the five villages of Llanwinio parish, in the diocese of St. David's.

The village features a pub named  (The Lamb Inn). There is a phone box and a children's play area owned by Llanwino Community Council. Moreia Welsh Independent Chapel was built in 1828 and remodelled in 1885.

It was previously home to the smallest post office in Wales, a  brick structure built in 1936 which was moved to St Fagans National Museum of History, near Cardiff, in 1992. , a mobile post office visits the village twice a week.

Dyffryn Brodyn, a 5.5 MW 11-turbine wind farm built in 1994, is adjacent to the village.

References 

Villages in Carmarthenshire